Vertiujeni is a village in Florești District, Moldova.

References

External links
 Vertiujeni in the list of Jewish agricultural colonies of Soroca District of Bessarabia

See also
Alexandru Mironov

Villages of Florești District
Populated places on the Dniester
Soroca County (Romania)
Former Jewish agricultural colonies of Bessarabia